"Retreat (Cries My Heart)" is a popular song, written by Nancy Farnsworth, Tommy Furtado, and Anita Boyer in 1952.

The most popular version was recorded by Patti Page in the same year.

1952 songs